Lene Madsen  (born 11 March 1973) is a Danish former football forward who played for the Denmark women's national football team. She competed at the 1996 Summer Olympics, playing three matches.

 315 games, 357 goals for Fortuna between 1993 and 2003

See also
 Denmark at the 1996 Summer Olympics

References

External links
 
 

1973 births
Living people
Danish women's footballers
Place of birth missing (living people)
Footballers at the 1996 Summer Olympics
Olympic footballers of Denmark
Women's association football forwards
1995 FIFA Women's World Cup players
Denmark women's international footballers